Christopher Langevin (born November 27, 1959) is a Canadian former professional ice hockey forward. He played twenty-two games in the National Hockey League with the Buffalo Sabres between 1983 and 1985, scoring three goals and adding one assist. The rest of his career, which laste from 1980 to 1986, was spent in the minor leagues.

Career statistics

Regular season and playoffs

References

External links
 

1959 births
Living people
Buffalo Sabres players
Canadian ice hockey forwards
Chicoutimi Saguenéens (QMJHL) players
Rochester Americans players
Saginaw Gears players
Ice hockey people from Montreal
Undrafted National Hockey League players